Philippsreut is a municipality in the district of Freyung-Grafenau in Bavaria, Germany. It lies on the border with the Czech Republic.

The village was founded in 1692 by Johann Philipp von Lamberg, Bishop of Passau, originally under the name Kleinphilippsreut ("Small Philip's Glade"), which name lasted until 1936. In times of founding it used to be a drinking station on the middle branch of the so-called "Golden Trail", an important medieval trade route connecting Bavaria and Bohemia. When trade on the Golden Trail gradually disappeared (during the first half of the 18th century), the village remained a poor mountainous settlement, whose inhabitants lived – like the other peoples in the Bavarian/Bohemian Forest – mainly from logging and glassmaking. Today, main source of livelihood is tourism.

Despite of its negligible size and remote location, Philippsreut has very good transport connections: here ends the Bundesstraße (federal highway) B12 and is continued on the Czech side by the silnice I/4 (road of 1st class) which heads towards Prague.

References

Freyung-Grafenau
Populated places established in 1692